The Massachusetts Banishment Act, officially named the "Banishment Act of the State of Massachusetts", was passed in September 1778 "to prevent the return to this state of certain persons therein named and others who have left this state or either of the United States, and joined the enemies thereof." Over 300 people, including many former officials of the Province of Massachusetts Bay, were listed in the act.

Notable people banished

Sir Francis Bernard, former provincial governor
Daniel Bliss, lawyer and court of common pleas judge
Jonathan Bliss, lawyer and justice of the peace
Sampson Salter Blowers, lawyer, friend of Benedict Arnold
Benjamin Church, physician and convicted spy
Thomas Cutler, lawyer
John Fleming, printer, publisher, and bookseller
Thomas Flucker, former secretary of the province
Sylvester Gardiner, physician and merchant
Bradford Gilbert, merchant
Harrison Gray, treasurer of the province
Joseph Green, poet and businessman
John Howe, printer and writer
Thomas Hutchinson, former provincial governor
John Jeffries, physician and military surgeon
Ephraim Jones, military commissary

Richard Lechmere, namesake of Lechmere Square
Daniel Leonard, lawyer
Joshua Loring, member of the Governor's Council
Daniel Murray, militia soldier of King's American Dragoons
Peter Oliver,  Chief Justice of the Superior Court
Thomas Oliver, former provincial lieutenant governor
Robert Pagan, merchant involved in shipbuilding
William Paine, physician
Sir William Pepperrell, merchant
Benjamin Pickman Sr., merchant
James Putnam, lawyer and former Attorney General
Isaac Royall, real estate investor, slave trader
Timothy Ruggles, member of the Stamp Act Congress
Jonathan Sewall, lawyer and former Attorney General 
Joshua Upham, lawyer
Edward Winslow, government official and peace officer

References

External links
Full list of people named in the act

1778 in American law
Massachusetts in the American Revolution
Massachusetts statutes
1778 in Massachusetts